This is a list of the judges, presidents, and governors of the Colony of Rhode Island and Providence Plantations from 1638 to 1776.

Governor of Providence 

Roger Williams June 1636 - September 1644

Judges of Portsmouth 

William Coddington 7 March 1638 - 28 April 1639
William Hutchinson 28 April 1639 - 14 March 1640

Judge of Newport 

William Coddington 28 April 1639 - 14 March 1640

Governor of Rhode Island (Portsmouth and Newport) 

William Coddington 14 March 1640 - 21 May 1647

Chief Officer under the Patent of 1643 (Providence and Warwick)

Roger Williams September 1644 - 21 May 1647

Presidents under the Patent of 1643

1st John Coggeshall of Newport; 21 May 1647 - 27 November 1647 (died in office)
2nd Jeremy Clarke of Newport; 16 May 1648 - 22 May 1649
3rd John Smith of Providence; 22 May 1649 - 23 May 1650
4th Nicholas Easton of Newport; 23 May 1650 - August 1651 (resigned)
5th Samuel Gorton of Warwick; October 1651 - 18 May 1652 (Providence and Warwick only)
6th John Smith of Providence; 18 May 1652 - 17 May 1653 (Providence and Warwick only)
7th Gregory Dexter of Providence; 17 May 1653 - 16 May 1654 (Providence and Warwick only)
8th Nicholas Easton of Newport; 16 May 1654 - 12 September 1654
9th Roger Williams of Providence; 12 September 1654 - 19 May 1657
10th Benedict Arnold of Newport; 19 May 1657 - 22 May 1660
11th William Brenton of Newport; 22 May 1660 - 22 May 1662
12th Benedict Arnold of Newport; 22 May 1662 - November 1663

Governors of Newport and Portsmouth under the Coddington Commission

William Coddington of Newport; 20 May 1651 - 17 May 1653
John Sanford of Portsmouth; 17 May 1653 - 1653 (died in office between June and November 1653)

Governors under the Royal Charter of 1663

Benedict Arnold November 1663 - 2 May 1666
William Brenton 2 May 1666 - 5 May 1669
Benedict Arnold 5 May 1669 - 1 May 1672
Nicholas Easton 1 May 1672 - 6 May 1674
William Coddington 6 May 1674 - 3 May 1676
Walter Clarke 3 May 1676 - 2 May 1677
Benedict Arnold 2 May 1677 - 19 June 1678 (died in office)
William Coddington 28 August 1678 - 1 November 1678 (died in office)
John Cranston 8 November 1678 - 12 March 1680 (died in office)
Peleg Sanford 16 March 1680 - 2 May 1683
William Coddington Jr. 2 May 1683 - 6 May 1685
Henry Bull 6 May 1685 - 5 May 1686
Walter Clarke 5 May 1686 - 20 December 1686 (superseded by Governor Andros)

Governor of the Dominion of New England
The Rhode Island Charter was suspended from 1686-1689.  During this time, Sir Edmund Andros served as Governor of the Dominion of New England, which included Rhode Island.  Andros was deposed on April 18, 1689.

Colonial Governors under the Royal Charter of 1663

Vacant 20 December 1686 - 27 February 1690
Henry Bull of Newport; 27 February 1690 - 7 May 1690
John Easton of Newport; 7 May 1690 - 1 May 1695
Caleb Carr of Jamestown; 1 May 1695 - 17 December 1695 (died in office)
Walter Clarke of Newport; 6 May 1696 - circa March 1698 (resigned)
Samuel Cranston of Newport; circa March 1698 - May 1727 (29 years 2 months.)
Joseph Jenckes of Providence; May 1727 - May 1732
William Wanton of Newport; May 1732 - between 3 December 1733 and 4 February 1734 (died in office)
John Wanton of Newport; 5 May 1734 - 5 July 1740 (died in office)
Richard Ward of Newport; 15 July 1740 - 4 May 1743
William Greene of Warwick; 4 May 1743 - 1 May 1745
Gideon Wanton of Newport; 1 May 1745 - 7 May 1746
William Greene of Warwick; 7 May 1746 - 6 May 1747
Gideon Wanton of Newport; 6 May 1747 - 4 May 1748
William Greene of Warwick; 4 May 1748 - 7 May 1755
Stephen Hopkins of Providence; 7 May 1755 - 4 May 1757
William Greene of Warwick; 4 May 1757 - 23 January 1758 (died in office)
Stephen Hopkins of Providence; 13 March 1758 - 5 May 1762
Samuel Ward of Newport; 5 May 1762 - 4 May 1763
Stephen Hopkins of Providence; May 1763 - 3 May 1765
Samuel Ward of Newport; 3 May 1765 - 1 May 1767
Stephen Hopkins of Providence; 1 May 1767 - 4 May 1768
Josias Lyndon of Newport; 4 May 1768 - 3 May 1769
Joseph Wanton of Newport; 3 May 1769 - 7 November 1775 (removed from office)
Nicholas Cooke of Providence; 7 November 1775 - 6 May 1778

Note - the Rhode Island Royal Charter of 1663 remained in effect until the Constitution of Rhode Island was ratified in 1842.  For a list of governors of Rhode Island from 1775 to the present see List of governors of Rhode Island.

See also

List of governors of Rhode Island
 List of lieutenant governors of Rhode Island

External links
 Chronological list of Rhode Island leaders

Rhode Island
Pre-statehood history of Rhode Island
History of religion in the United States
People of colonial Rhode Island
Rhode Island in the American Revolution